Alessio Foconi (born 22 November 1989) is an Italian right-handed foil fencer and 2021 Olympian.

Foconi is a 2022 team European champion, 2019 individual European champion, three-time team world champion, and 2018 individual world champion.

Career
Born in Rome, Foconi took up fencing in Terni, Umbria. He was coached in his formative years by Filippo Romagnoli and Giulio Tomassini.

In 2008 he created an upset at the Espinho World Cup after defeating Renal Ganeyev, Ruslan Nasibulin and Choi Byung-chul. He was stopped in the semifinals by fellow countryman and team Olympic champion Simone Vanni and came away with a bronze medal. The next year he won a team bronze medal at the Junior European Championships in Amsterdam and an individual bronze and a team gold at the Junior World Championships in Belfast.

In 2010–11 he took another World Cup bronze, this time at the Shanghai Grand Prix, and finished the season 25th in the world rankings. He did not qualify to the 2012 Summer Olympics, but maintained his Top 25 ranking. In 2013 he won the Italian championship after defeating Valerio Aspromonte in the final.

In the 2014–15 season Foconi bounced back in the World Cup circuit by posting a quarter-final finish in the Paris World Cup, then a bronze medal in the Löwe von Bonn.

Medal Record

World Championship

European Championship

Grand Prix

World Cup

References

External links
 
  (archive)

1989 births
Living people
Italian male foil fencers
Fencers from Rome
Universiade silver medalists for Italy
Universiade medalists in fencing
Fencers at the 2015 European Games
European Games medalists in fencing
European Games gold medalists for Italy
European Games silver medalists for Italy
World Fencing Championships medalists
Medalists at the 2011 Summer Universiade
Medalists at the 2013 Summer Universiade
Fencers at the 2020 Summer Olympics
Olympic fencers of Italy
21st-century Italian people